Vardan (Vartan in Western Armenian transliteration, pronounced  in both Eastern and Western Armenian), Varden in Georgian, is an Armenian name of Middle Persian origin (from Mid. Pers. Wardā), popular in Armenia and Georgia.

Saint Vardan
Saint Vardan (Saint Vartan in Western Armenian), an Armenian saint. See Vardan Mamikonian

Given name
Vardan Adjemyan, Armenian composer of orchestral, operatic and chamber works
Vardan Adzemian (born 1984), American soccer player of Armenian heritage
Vardan Aigektsi (died 1250), Armenian author
Vardan Ajemian (1905–1977), Soviet Armenian theatral director and actor, People's Artist of USSR (1965)
Vardan Areveltsi (1198–1271), Armenian historian, geographer, philosopher and translator
Vardan Ayvazyan, the current Ecology Minister of Armenia
Vardan Bostanjyan (born 1949), Armenian politician
Vardan Ghazaryan (born 1969), Lebanese-Armenian footballer
Vardan Khachatryan (born 1968), former Armenian football defender
Vardan Kushnir (1969–2005), spammer of Armenian descent
Vardan Mamikonian (musician), Armenian pianist, and a naturalised French citizen
Vardan Mazalov (born 1983), Uzbek SSR born Armenian football striker
Vardan Militosyan (born 1950), Armenian weightlifter
Vardan Minasyan (born 1974), Armenian football manager and former player
Vardan Oskanyan (born 1955), Minister of Foreign Affairs of Armenia during 1998–2008
Vardan Voskanyan (born 1972), Armenian judoka

See also
Vartan, another romanization of the name (used mostly in Western Armenian)

References 

Armenian masculine given names
Persian masculine given names